The Four Corners is a region of the Southwestern United States consisting of the southwestern corner of Colorado, southeastern corner of Utah, northeastern corner of Arizona, and northwestern corner of New Mexico. Most of the Four Corners region belongs to semi-autonomous Native American nations, the largest of which is the Navajo Nation, followed by Hopi, Ute, and Zuni tribal reserves and nations. The Four Corners region is part of a larger region known as the Colorado Plateau and is mostly rural, rugged, and arid.

The Four Corners area is named after the quadripoint at the intersection of approximately 37° north latitude with 109° 03' west longitude, where the boundaries of the four states meet, and are marked by the Four Corners Monument. It is the only location in the United States where four states meet. In addition to the monument, commonly visited areas within Four Corners include Monument Valley, Mesa Verde National Park, Chaco Canyon, Canyons of the Ancients National Monument and Canyon de Chelly National Monument. The most populous city in the Four Corners region is Farmington, New Mexico, followed by Durango, Colorado.

History
The United States acquired the four corners region from Mexico after the end of the Mexican–American War in 1848. In 1863 Congress created the Arizona Territory from the western part of New Mexico Territory. The boundary was legally defined as a line running due south from the southwest corner of Colorado Territory, which had been created in 1861. This was an unusual act of Congress, which almost always defined the boundaries of new territories as lines of latitude or longitude, or following rivers, but seldom as extensions of other boundaries.

By defining one boundary as starting at the corner of another, Congress ensured the eventual creation of four states meeting at a point, regardless of the inevitable errors of boundary surveying. The area was first surveyed by the U.S. Government in 1868 as part of an effort to make Colorado Territory into a state, the first of the Four Corners states formed.

The first marker was placed at the originally surveyed and current spot in 1868. In 1925, some 57 years after Congress had first attempted to specify the spot, the problems surrounding the originally misplaced marker were brought up before the US Supreme Court. This initial survey error has resulted in some longstanding misunderstandings about the correct location of the Four Corners marker, some of which remain to this day. The first Navajo tribal government was established in 1923 to regulate an increasing number of oil exploration activities on Navajo land.

Geography

The Four Corners is part of the high Colorado Plateau. This makes it a center for weather systems, which stabilize on the plateau then proceed eastward through Colorado and into the central states. This weather system creates snow- and rainfall over the central United States.

Federally protected areas in the Four Corners area include Canyon de Chelly National Monument, Hovenweep National Monument, Mesa Verde National Park, and Canyons of the Ancients National Monument. Mountain Ranges in the Four Corners include Sleeping Ute Mountains, Abajo Mountains, and the Chuska Mountains.

Politics
Six governments have jurisdictional boundaries at the Four Corners Monument: the states of Arizona, Colorado, New Mexico, and Utah, as well as the tribal governments of the Navajo Nation and Ute Mountain Ute Tribe. The Four Corners Monument itself is administered by the Navajo Nation Department of Parks and Recreation. Other tribal nations within the Four Corners region include the Hopi and other Ute. The Four Corners is home to the capital of the Navajo tribal government at Window Rock, Arizona. The Ute Mountain Ute tribal headquarters are located at Towaoc, Colorado. The US federal government also has a large presence in the area, particularly the Department of the Interior with the Bureau of Indian Affairs and the Department of Agriculture with the Forest Service.

Cities
The Four Corners region is mostly rural. The economic hub, largest city, and only metropolitan area in the region is Farmington, New Mexico. The populated settlement closest to the center of Four Corners is Teec Nos Pos, Arizona. Other cities in the region include Cortez and Durango in Colorado; Monticello and Blanding in Utah; Kayenta and Chinle in Arizona; and Shiprock, Aztec, and Bloomfield in New Mexico.

Transportation
Air service is available via the Durango-La Plata County Airport in Durango, Colorado, Four Corners Regional Airport in Farmington, New Mexico, and Cortez Municipal Airport in Cortez, Colorado. Interstate 40 passes along the southern edge of the Four Corners region. The primary U.S. Highways that directly serve the Four Corners include U.S. Route 64, U.S. Route 160 (which serves the Four Corners Monument itself), U.S. Route 163, U.S. Route 191, U.S. Route 491 (previously U.S. Route 666), and U.S. Route 550.

The main line of the Atchison, Topeka and Santa Fe Railway, now operated by the BNSF Railway, passes along the southern edge of Four Corners. The area is home to remnants of through railroads that are now heritage railways. These include the Durango and Silverton Narrow Gauge Railroad and the Cumbres and Toltec Scenic Railroad. The Black Mesa and Lake Powell Railroad, which connects a power plant with a coal mine near Kayenta, comes near the Four Corners.

See also
 Four Corners Monument
 List of regions of the United States
 Four Corners radio stations
 Canadian four corners
 Quadripoint
 TAG Corner
 Trail of the Ancients National Scenic Byway, Four Corners, Colorado and Utah
 Trail of the Ancients Scenic Byway (New Mexico)
 List of tripoints of U.S. states

References

External links

 

Colorado Plateau
Geography of Apache County, Arizona
Geography of Montezuma County, Colorado
Geography of San Juan County, New Mexico
Geography of San Juan County, Utah
Geography of the United States
Regions of the United States
Religious places of the indigenous peoples of North America
Western United States